The legal system of India consists of Civil law, Common law, Customary law, Religious law and Corporate law within the legal framework inherited from the colonial era and various legislation first introduced by the British are still in effect in modified forms today. Since the drafting of the Indian Constitution, Indian laws also adhere to the United Nations guidelines on human rights law and the environmental law.

Indian personal law is fairly complex, with each religion adhering to its own specific laws. In most states, registering of marriages and divorces is not compulsory. Separate laws govern Hindus including Sikhs, Jains and Buddhist, Muslims, Christians, and followers of other religions. The exception to this rule is in the state of Goa, where a uniform civil code is in place, in which all religions have a common law regarding marriages, divorces, and adoption. In the first major reformist judgment for the last decade, the Supreme Court of India banned the Islamic practice of "Triple Talaq" (divorce by uttering of the "Talaq" word thrice by the husband). The landmark Supreme Court of India judgment was welcomed by women activists across India.

, there are about 839 Central laws as per the online repository hosted by the Legislative Department, Ministry of Law and Justice, Government of India. Further, there are many State laws for each state, which can also be accessed from the same repository.

History 

Ancient India represented a distinct tradition of law, and had a historically independent thought of legal theory and practice. The Dharmaśāstras played an important role. The Arthashastra, dating from 400 BC and the Manusmriti, from 100 AD, were influential treatises in India, texts that were considered authoritative legal guidance. Manu's central philosophy was tolerance and pluralism, and was cited across Southeast Asia.

Early in this period, which culminated in the creation of the Gupta Empire, relations with ancient Greece and Rome were not infrequent. The appearance of similar fundamental institutions of international law in various parts of the world show that they are inherent in international society, irrespective of culture and tradition. Inter-State relations in the pre-Islamic period resulted in clear-cut rules of warfare of a high humanitarian standard, in rules of neutrality, of treaty law, of customary law embodied in religious charters, in exchange of embassies of a temporary or semi-permanent character.

After the Muslim conquest in the Indian subcontinent, Islamic Sharia law spread with the establishment of Delhi Sultanate, Bengal Sultanate and Gujarat Sultanate.
The Corps of Forty also played a major role by establishing some Turkish law in India.

In the 17th century, when the Mughal Empire became the world's largest economy, its sixth ruler, Aurangzeb, compiled the Fatawa-e-Alamgiri with several Arab and Iraqi Islamic scholars, which served as the main governing body in most parts of South Asia.

With the advent of the British Raj, there was a break in tradition, and Hindu and Islamic law were abolished in favour of British common law. As a result, the present judicial system of the country derives largely from the British system and has few, if any, connections to Indian legal institutions of the pre-British era.

Constitutional and administrative law 

The Constitution of India, which came into effect on 26 January 1950 is the lengthiest written constitution in the world. Although its administrative provisions are to a large extent based on the Government of India Act 1935, it also contains various other provisions that were drawn from other constitutions in the world at the time of its creation. It provides details of the administration of both the Union and the States, and codifies the relations between the Federal Government and the State Governments. Also incorporated into the text are a chapter on the fundamental rights of citizens, as well as a chapter on directive principles of state policy.

The constitution prescribes a federal structure of government, with a clearly defined separation of legislative and executive powers between the Federation and the States. Each State Government has the freedom to draft its own laws on subjects classified as state subjects. Laws passed by the Parliament of India and other pre-existing central laws on subjects classified as central subjects are binding on all citizens. However, the Constitution also has certain unitary features, such as vesting power of amendment solely in the Federal Government, the absence of dual citizenship, and the overriding authority assumed by the Federal Government in times of emergency.

Criminal law 

The Indian Penal Code formulated by the British during the British Raj in 1860, forms the backbone of criminal law in India. The Code of Criminal Procedure, 1973 governs the procedural aspects of the criminal law.

Jury trials were abolished by the government in 1960 on the grounds they would be susceptible to media and public influence. This decision was based on an 8-1 acquittal of Kawas Nanavati in K. M. Nanavati vs. State of Maharashtra, which was overturned by higher courts.

In February 2011, the Supreme Court of India ruled that criminal defendants have a constitutional right to counsel.

Capital punishment in India is legal. Renuka Shinde and Seema Mohan Gavit, who were guilty of kidnapping and killing at least 13 children under 6 years, are currently lodged in Yerwada Central Jail. They were also the first women in India to be given capital punishment. The last execution was conducted on 20 March 2020, where the death sentence was awarded to the convicts—Pawan Gupta, Akshay Singh Thakur, Vinay Sharma, and Mukesh Singh—by a trial court, a decision which was upheld by Delhi High Court and Supreme Court as well.

Contract law 

The main contract law in India is codified in the Indian Contract Act, which came into effect on 1 September 1872 and extends to all India. It governs entrance into contract, and effects of breach of contract.
Indian Contract law is popularly known as mercantile law of India. Originally Indian Sales of Goods Act and Partnership Act were part of Indian Contract act, but due to needed amendment these acts were separated from Contract Act. The Contract act occupies the most important place in legal agreements in India.

Labour law 

Indian labour law are among the most comprehensive in the world. They have been criticised by the World Bank, primarily on the grounds of the inflexibility that results from government needing to approve dismissals. In practice, there is a large informal sector of workers, between 80 or 90 per cent of the labour force, to whom labour rights are not actually available and laws are not enforced.

Company law 

The current Indian company law was updated and recodified in the Companies Act 2013.

Tort law 

Tort law in India is primarily governed by judicial precedent as in other common law jurisdictions, supplemented by statutes governing damages, civil procedure, and codifying common law torts. As in other common law jurisdictions, a tort is breach of a non-contractual duty which has caused damage to the plaintiff giving rise to a civil cause of action and for which remedy is available. If a remedy does not exist, a tort has not been committed since the rationale of tort law is to provide a remedy to the person who has been wronged.

While Indian tort law is generally derived from English law, there are certain differences between the two systems. Indian tort law uniquely includes remedies for constitutional torts, which are actions by the government that infringe upon rights enshrined in the Constitution, as well as a system of absolute liability for businesses engaged in hazardous activity.

As tort law is similar in nature across common law jurisdictions, courts have readily referred to case law from other common law jurisdictions such as the UK, Australia, and Canada in addition to domestic precedent. However, attention is given to local norms and conditions, as well as India’s distinct constitutional framework in applying foreign precedent. The legislature have also created statutes to provide for certain social conditions. Similar to other common law countries, aspects of tort law have been codified.

Certain conduct which gives rise to a cause of action under tort law is additionally criminalised by the Indian Penal Code or other criminal legislation. Where a tort also constitutes a criminal offence, its prosecution by the state does not preclude the aggrieved party from seeking a remedy under tort law. The overlap between the two areas of law is a result of the distinct purposes each serves and the nature of the remedies each provides. Tort law aims to hold a tortfeasor accountable and consequently tort actions are brought directly by the aggrieved party in order to seek damages, whereas criminal law aims to punish and deter conduct deemed to be against the interests of society and criminal actions are thus brought by the state and penalties include imprisonment, fines, or execution.

In India, as in the majority of common law jurisdictions, the standard of proof in tort cases is the balance of probabilities as opposed to the reasonable doubt standard used in criminal cases or the preponderance of the evidence standard used in American tort litigation, although the latter is extremely similar in practice to the balance of probabilities standard. Similar to the constitutional presumption of innocence in Indian criminal law, the burden of proof is on the plaintiff in tort actions in India. India, like the majority of common law jurisdictions in Asia  and Africa, does not permit the use of juries in civil or criminal trials, in direct contrast to America and the Canadian common law provinces which retain civil juries as well as to jurisdictions like England and Wales or New Zealand which permit juries in a limited set of tort actions.

Property law

Tax law 
Indian tax law involves several different taxes levied by different governments. Income Tax is levied by the Central Government under the Income Tax Act 1961. Customs and excise duties are also levied by the Central government. Sales tax is levied under VAT legislation at the state level. Since a new tax reform in the form of GST was levied through constitutional amendment  and came into existence since 1st July 2017 which took the place of excise duties and VAT.

The authority to levy a tax is derived from the Constitution of India which allocates the power to levy various taxes between the Centre and the State. An important restriction on this power is Article 265 of the Constitution which states that "No tax shall be levied or collected except by the authority of law." Therefore, each tax levied or collected has to be backed by an accompanying law, passed either by the Parliament or the State Legislature. In 2010-11, the gross tax collection amounted to  7.92 billion (Long scale), with direct tax and indirect tax contributing 56% and 44% respectively.

Central Board of Direct Taxes 
The Central Board of Direct Taxes (CBDT) is a part of the Department of Revenue in the Ministry of Finance, Government of India. The CBDT provides essential inputs for policy and planning of direct taxes in India and is also responsible for administration of the direct tax laws through Income Tax Department. The CBDT is a statutory authority functioning under the Central Board of Revenue Act, 1963. It is India’s official FATF unit. The Central Board of Revenue as the Department apex body charged with the administration of taxes came into existence as a result of the Central Board of Revenue Act, 1924. Initially the Board was in charge of both direct and indirect taxes. However, when the administration of taxes became too unwieldy for one Board to handle, the Board was split up into two, namely the Central Board of Direct Taxes and Central Board of Excise and Customs with effect from 1 January 1964. This bifurcation was brought about by constitution of the two Boards u/s 3 of the Central Boards of Revenue Act, 1963.

Income Tax Act of 1961 
The major tax enactment is the Income Tax Act  of 1961 passed by the Parliament, which establishes and governs the taxation of the incomes of individuals and corporations. This Act imposes a tax on income under the following five heads:
  Income from house and property,
 Income from business and profession,
 Income from salaries,
 Income in the form of Capital gains, and
 Income from other sources

However, this Act may soon be repealed and be replaced with a new Act consolidating the law relating to Income Tax and Wealth Tax, the new proposed legislation is called the Direct Taxes Code (to become the Direct Taxes Code, Act 2010). Act was referred to Parliamentary standing committee which has submitted its recommendations. Act is expected to be implemented with changes from the Financial Year 2013–14.

Goods and Services Tax 
Goods and Services Tax (India) is a comprehensive indirect tax on manufacture, sale and consumption of goods and services throughout India to replace taxes levied by the central and state governments. It was introduced as The Constitution (One Hundred and First Amendment) Act 2016, following the passage of Constitution 101st Amendment Bill. The GST is governed by GST Council and its Chairman is Nirmala Sitaraman, Finance Minister of India.

This method allows GST - registered businesses to claim tax credit to the value of GST they paid on purchase of goods or services as part of their normal commercial activity. Administrative responsibility would generally rest with a single authority to levy tax on goods and services. Exports would be considered as zero-rated supply and imports would be levied the same taxes as domestic goods and services adhering to the destination principle in addition to the Customs Duty which will not be subsumed in the GST.

Introduction of Goods and Services Tax (GST) is a significant step in the reform of indirect taxation in India. Amalgamating several Central and State taxes into a single tax would mitigate cascading or double taxation, facilitating a common national market. The simplicity of the tax should lead to easier administration and enforcement. From the consumer point of view, the biggest advantage would be in terms of a reduction in the overall tax burden on goods, which is currently estimated at 25%-30%, free movement of goods from one state to another without stopping at state borders for hours for payment of state tax or entry tax and reduction in paperwork to a large extent.

GST came into effect on 1 July 2017.

Trust law 
Trust law in India is mainly codified in the Indian Trusts Act of 1882, which came into force on 1 March 1882. It extends to the whole of India except for the state of Jammu and Kashmir and Andaman and Nicobar Islands. Indian law follows principles of English law in most areas of law, but the law of trusts is a notable exception. Indian law does not recognize "double ownership", and a beneficiary of trust property is not the equitable owner of the property in Indian law.

Family law – personal law 

Family laws in India are different when Warren Hastings in 1772 created provisions prescribing Hindu law for Hindus and Islamic law for Muslims, for litigation relating to personal matters. However, after independence, efforts have been made to modernise various aspects of personal law and bring about uniformity among various religions. Recent reform has affected custody and guardianship laws, adoption laws, succession laws, and laws concerning domestic violence and child marriage.

Hindu Law 

As far as Hindus are concerned Hindu Law is a specific branch of law. Though the attempt made by the first parliament after independence did not succeed in bringing forth a Hindu Code comprising the entire field of Hindu family law, laws could be enacted touching upon all major areas that affect family life among Hindus in India. Jains, Sikhs and Buddhists are also covered by Hindu law.

Muslim law 

Indian Muslims' personal laws are based upon the Sharia, which is thus partially applied in India, and laws and legal judgements adapting and adjusting Sharia for Indian society. The portion of the fiqh applicable to Indian Muslims as personal law is termed Mohammedan law. Despite being largely uncodified, Mohammedan law has the same legal status as other codified statutes. The development of the law is largely on the basis of judicial precedent, which in recent times has been subject to review by the courts. The concept of the judicial precedent and of 'review by the courts' is a key component of the British common law upon which Indian law is based. The contribution of Justice V.R. Krishna Iyer in the matter of interpretation of the statutory as well as personal law is significant.

Sunni Law:
 Quran
 Sunna or Ahdis (Tradition of the Prophet)
 Ijma (Unanimous Decision of the Jurists)
 Qiyas ( Analogical deduction)

As per Shia Law:

Usooli Shia
 Quran
 Tradition (only those that have come from the family of the Prophet)
 Ijma (only those confirmed by Imams)
 Reasons

Akhbari Shia
 Tradition (only those that have come from the family of the Prophet)

Polygamy and triple talaq is a subject of debate from long time. It has been abolished in many Islamic countries, but still holds its legal validity in the secular country of India. Supreme court asked the central government for its views, to which it replied that polygamy should be done away with.

Christian Law 

For Christians, a distinct branch of law known as Christian Law, mostly based on specific statutes, applies.

Christian law of Succession and Divorce in India have undergone changes in recent years. The Indian Divorce (Amendment) Act of 2001 has brought in considerable changes in the grounds available for divorce. By now Christian law in India has emerged as a separate branch of law. It covers the entire spectrum of family law so far as it concerns Christians in India. Christian law, to a great extent is based on English law but there are laws that originated on the strength of customary practices and precedents.

Christian family law has now distinct sub branches like laws on marriage, divorce, restitution, judicial separation, succession, adoption, guardianship, maintenance, custody of minor children and relevance of canon law and all that regulates familial relationship.

Parsi law 

The Parsi law is the law governing the Parsi Zoroastrian community.

Nationality law 

Nationality law or citizenship law is mainly codified in the Constitution of India and the Citizenship Act of 1955. Although the Constitution of India bars multiple citizenship, the Parliament of India passed on 7 January 2004, a law creating a new form of very limited dual nationality called Overseas Citizenship of India. Overseas citizens of India have no form of political rights or participation in the government, however, and there are no plans to issue to overseas citizens any form of Indian passport.

Law enforcement 

Law enforcement in India is undertaken by numerous law enforcement agencies. Like many federal structures, the nature of the Constitution of India mandates law and order as a subject of the state, therefore the bulk of the policing lies with the respective states and territories of India.

At the federal level, the many agencies are part of the Union Ministry of Home Affairs, and support the states in their duties. Larger cities also operate metropolitan police forces, under respective state governments. All senior police officers in the state police forces, as well as those in the federal agencies, are members of the Indian Police Service (IPS) and Indian Revenue Service (IRS), two of the several kinds of civil services. They are recruited by the Union Public Service Commission.

Police Force 
The federal police are controlled by the central Government of India. The majority of federal law enforcement agencies are controlled by the Ministry of Home Affairs. The head of each of the federal law enforcement agencies is always an Indian Police Service officer (IPS). The constitution assigns responsibility for maintaining law and order to the states and territories, and almost all routine policing—including apprehension of criminals—is carried out by state-level police forces. The constitution also permits the central government to participate in police operations and organization by authorizing the maintenance of the Indian Police Service. Indian

Law reforms 
Government usually appoints Law Commission panels to study and make non-binding recommendations for the law reform. In first 65 years 1,301 obsolete laws were repealed, including 1029 old laws in 1950 by Jawaharlal Nehru and 272 old laws in 2004 by Atal Bihari Vajpayee. After that 1,824 such laws were repealed by Narendra Modi government between May 2014 to December 2017, taking the total to 3,125.

Subordinate legislation in India 
Subordinate, delegated or secondary legislation covers rules, regulations, by-laws, sub-rules, orders, and notification.

 rule: according to the General Clauses Acts, 1897, "rule" shall mean a rule made in exercise of a power conferred by any enactment, and shall include a Regulation made as a rule under any enactment.

See also 

 History of Indian law
 Central Bureau of Investigation
 Law enforcement in India
 Legal systems of the world
 Indian criminal law

References

Citations

Sources 

 
 
 
 
 
 Kane, P.V. History of Dharmaśāstra
 Shourie, A. (2012). World of Fatwas or the Sharia in action. Harpercollins India. .
 Shourie, Arun (2002). Courts and their judgments: Premises, prerequisites, consequences. New Delhi: Rupa. .